Parosmodes lentiginosa, the rare Morant skipper, is a butterfly in the family Hesperiidae. It is found in Sierra Leone, Liberia, Ivory Coast, Ghana, Nigeria (the Cross River loop), Cameroon, Gabon, Angola, the Central African Republic and the Democratic Republic of the Congo. The habitat consists of forests and forest/savanna mosaic.

References

Butterflies described in 1896
Erionotini
Butterflies of Africa